La Campana de Gràcia ("Gràcia's bell") was a seminal Catalan weekly magazine of satire, written bilingually in Catalan and Spanish of the late 19th and early 20th century, staunchly supportive of republicanism and anticlericalism. The headquarters was in Barcelona.

History and profile
The magazine was first published on 8 May 1870. The magazine was published on a weekly basis. Although at first it focused on the Spanish politics of the time, often leaving out Catalan politics and Catalanist actions, its ideological tone changed over time and by 1906 it openly expressed support for Solidaritat Catalana and Catalan working-class left-wing political issues. From 1932 until its last issue in 1934, it was owned by ERC. Two of its most notable directors were Antonio Sierra and Prudenci Bertrana.

See also
 El Be Negre
L'Esquella de la Torratxa

References

External links

 Digitization is available through the portal ARCA (Arxiu de Revistes Catalanes Antigues= Old Catalan Serials Archive)
Francesc Mestre: Ilustradores Ilustres

1870 establishments in Spain
1934 disestablishments in Spain
Magazines published in Catalonia
Catalan-language magazines
Defunct magazines published in Spain
Satirical magazines published in Spain
Gràcia
Magazines established in 1870
Magazines disestablished in 1934
Magazines published in Barcelona
Spanish-language magazines
Weekly magazines published in Spain
Spanish political satire